The Eminent Jay Jay Johnson, Vol. 3 is a 1955 Blue Note 10" LP of a small group led by American jazz trombonist J. J. Johnson.

Release history
The Eminent Jay Jay Johnson, Vol. 3 (Blue Note BLP 5070) was recorded and released in 1955 as the third of three Jay Jay Johnson albums in Blue Note's 10-inch LP Modern Jazz 5000 Series.  In 1955, Blue Note released two 12 inch compilation LPs that together included all tracks from the three 10 inch LPs as well as alternate take 'bonus tracks' from the  1953 ...with Clifford Brown,... recording session: The Eminent Jay Jay Johnson, Volume 1 (BLP 1505) and The Eminent Jay Jay Johnson, Volume 2 (BLP 1506).  All of the ...Vol. 3 tracks were included on the …Volume 2 compilation LP and (after 1989) CD.

Track listing
Side 'A'
 "Daylie Double" (Johnson) – 4:27 
 "You're Mine, You" (Johnny Green, Edward Heyman) – 3:07 
 "Pennies from Heaven" (Johnny Burke, Arthur Johnston) – 4:18
Side 'B'
 "Groovin'" (Johnson) – 4:40 
 "Viscosity" (Johnson) – 4:21 
 "Portrait of Jennie" (Gordon Burdge, J. Russel Robinson) – 2:56

Personnel
J.J. Johnson – trombone
Hank Mobley – tenor saxophone
Horace Silver – piano
Paul Chambers – bass
Kenny Clarke – drums

References

Blue Note Records BLP 5070 
Blue Note Records BLP 1506 
Blue Note Records CDP 7 81506 2 
J. J. Johnson, A Comprehensive Discography… by Louis George Bourgois  
jazzdisco.org Jazz Discography Project  
www.discogs.com

Blue Note Records albums
J. J. Johnson albums
1955 albums
Albums recorded at Van Gelder Studio